Josip Juric is a Croatian former footballer who played in the Croatian First Football League, and Canadian Professional Soccer League.

Club career 
Juric played with NK Belišće from 1994-1996 in the Croatian First Football League. He later played with HNK Vukovar '91, where he appeared in nine matches. In 2002, he went abroad to play in the Canadian Professional Soccer League with Toronto Croatia. In his debut season with Toronto he played in the Canada Cup final against Ottawa Wizards. Another achievement was clinching the Western Conference title, which secured a postseason berth for Croatia. He featured in the preliminary match against North York Astros, but were eliminated from the competition after a 1-0 loss.

References 

Year of birth missing (living people)
Living people
Place of birth missing (living people)
Association football midfielders
Croatian footballers
NK Belišće players
HNK Vukovar '91 players
Toronto Croatia players
Croatian Football League players
Canadian Soccer League (1998–present) players
Croatian expatriate footballers
Expatriate soccer players in Canada
Croatian expatriate sportspeople in Canada